The Lathums are an English indie rock band from Wigan, Greater Manchester. They are formed of singer/songwriter and guitarist Alex Moore, lead guitarist Scott Concepcion, bassist Matty Murphy and drummer Ryan Durrans, and are managed by Alfie Skelly. They were put together by 'The Music Project', a stage school specialising in music, art, games and media, in the local district of Pemberton in April 2018, after their tutor placed them in the same project group, and within a year they signed with Island Records. They released their debut album, How Beautiful Life Can Be, on 24 September 2021. It debuted at number one on the UK Albums Chart on 1 October 2021.

History

2018–2019: Formation 
Alex Moore, frontman of the band, first met Scott Concepcion before the band formed. The band began as a music project at college in Pemberton, Greater Manchester. The members consisted of drummer Ryan Durrans, bassist Lewis Halliwell, guitarist Scott Concepcion and singer Alex Moore. The band are named after a venue that they performed at. It's commonly pronounced as "La-thums", rather than "Lay-thums". When asked how it's pronounced, Moore stated, "It's just how we pronounce it. It's just how it was christened." Halliwell later left the band, so Johnny Cunliffe came on as a replacement, who also went to the same college.

In 2018, the band wrote their first song together, "Artificial Screens", which they would self-release, along with other singles that would be re-released and remastered later down the line. In April 2019, the band released their first official single, "Crying Out". It was recorded by John Kettle and then later issued. Later on, the band released another single, "The Great Escape". This garnered the attention of Tim Burgess from the Charlatans. He invited the band to play a set at Kendal Calling.

2020–2021: COVID-19 and How Beautiful Life Can Be 
The Lathums were signed to Island Records in March 2020. The band were set as support acts for Paul Weller and Blossoms, but they were postponed due to the COVID-19 pandemic. During the COVID-19 lockdowns, the band released "All My Life" in July, an acoustic ballad, written by a 16-year-old Moore. It was produced the Coral's James Skelly  at Liverpool's Parr Street Studio.

In September 2021, the band released their debut album, How Beautiful Life Can Be, which featured remastered versions of previously released singles, alongside new songs.

2022–present: Cunliffe's departure and From Nothing to a Little Bit More 
In April 2022, the band released Sad Face Baby, the last single to feature Johnny Cunliffe on bass before his departure in 2022. The band brought on Matty Murphy as a replacement, but was not officially dubbed as a member until January 2023. During the time of Cunliffe's absence, the band were a support act for The Killers. Moore got the chance to do a cover of How Beautiful Life Can Be with them on stage, with Alex on acoustic guitar and Brandon Flowers on co-lead vocals.

In November 2022, the band announced their second album, From Nothing to a Little Bit More. Following the announcement, "Say My Name" and "Turmoil" were released.

In December 2022 "Say My Name" was named the Radio X Record of the Year.

In January 2023 they released the single "Struggle".

Musical style and influences 
The Lathums are an indie rock band influenced by, and often compared to, the Smiths and Arctic Monkeys. Concepcion said his "personal influences have been drawn from many places across British musical history".

Band members 
Current members
 Alex Moore – lead vocals, guitars (2018–present)
 Scott Concepcion – backing vocals, guitars, piano (2018–present)
 Ryan Durrans – drums (2018–present)
 Matty Murphy – bass guitar, backing vocals (2023–present)

Former members
 Lewis Halliwell  – bass guitar (2018)
 Johnny Cunliffe – bass guitar (2018–2022)

Discography

Studio albums

Live albums

Extended plays

Singles

References

English indie rock groups
Organisations based in Wigan
Musical groups established in 2019
Island Records artists
Musical groups from Lancashire
2019 establishments in England